The Pah Homestead is a historic home located in the suburb of Hillsborough in Auckland, New Zealand. It is owned by the Auckland Council, and is currently used as an art gallery, housing the James Wallace Art Trust's collection of New Zealand art. Since opening in August 2010, the gallery has attracted over 410,000 visitors, including 130,000 in its first year

History

The homestead was built between 1877 and 1879 as Auckland businessman James Williamson's "gentleman's residence" by Thomas Mahoney, and was one of the largest and finest homes in Auckland at that time. Of plastered brick in the Italianate style, it is based on Queen Victoria and Prince Albert's Osborne House in the Isle of Wight. The tree-lined drive to Pah Road remains largely intact, although parts of it now run through private properties adjoining the proposed park. The grounds include some of the finest exotic trees in Auckland, and there are views to the Manukau Harbour and to One Tree Hill.

The site was a fortified Māori pa during the 17th and 18th centuries, although it was probably abandoned during the latter part of the 18th century. By the early years of the 19th century little evidence probably remained above ground. It may have been occupied by Pōtatau Te Wherowhero between 1839 and 1844 (Te Wherowhero would become the first Māori king in 1858). In 1844 William Hart was able to purchase the property (referred to as The Koheraunui No.1 Block) from Ngāti Whātua, although the purchase, like many at the time, had to go through an official process. Hart's original claim of 400 acres (161 ha) was reduced by the Government land Commission to 193 acres (78ha).

Hart built a Regency styled villa on the site in 1847. Hart had been intrigued by reports that the hill had been a fortified Maori pa and excavations for the house did uncover evidence of tōtara wood palisades which may have dated from the mid 18th century.  Hart increased the size of the farm to 250 acres by purchasing the adjacent properties (66 acres: Koheranui No. 2 in 1846); he raised cattle for beef and dairy purposes as well as cultivating wheat and barley. As well as wind break trees, orchards and other agricultural plantings, Hart planted a number of exotic specimen trees on the site including what is now the largest hoop pine (Araucaria cunninghamii) in New Zealand, and several Morton Bay figs (Ficus macrophylla), including the largest example in New Zealand.

In 1866 the farm was sold to Thomas Russell for  £12,725. Russell was an active member of the Auckland Horticultural Society and added many interesting plants to the property including a Chilean wine palm (Jubaea chilensis), several Bunya Bunya pines (Araucaria bidwillii) and a circular grove of holm oaks (Quercus ilex). In January 1872, Cyrus Haley, who had a grudge against Russell, attacked the home, firing shots into each of the bedrooms. No-one was hurt and Haley was later caught and convicted of attempted murder.

In 1877 James Williamson purchased the property for £10,000 which was substantially less than what Russell had paid for it ten years earlier; Russell had returned to Britain three years earlier. Williamson retained the name "The Pah" and demolished the thirty-year-old house to make way for one of the largest and most expensive houses ever built in the colony.

Designed by Edward Mahoney & Sons, the house is an Italianate villa, constructed of brick rendered with cement to imitate stone.  The Pah featured verandahs, balconies and a central tower with a viewing room at the top to give a 360-degree view of the landscape. The house enjoyed vista to One Tree Hill to the north, Mount Smart to the east and the Manukau Harbour to the south. The viewing room was equipped with a telescope. The main rooms are distinguished by high quality plaster ceilings, Italian marble fireplaces, parquet floors with inlaid borders and finely chased metal fixtures to the doors.

The bay windows are very large and the glass pane of the sash windows are actually curved - an added example of the sumptuous fitout of this residence. The hall is panelled in wood supplied by Gillow and Sons (the royal cabinet makers), who also supplied all the furniture for the house. The contents of the house were sold off at public auction in 1888; remarkably none of the Gillows furniture has ever subsequently been identified despite it all being stamped by the company - the only remaining piece is the built-in coat stand in the hall.

Williamson had dreamed of creating a family dynasty with this estate as its symbol, however following the stock market crash in 1886 Williamson was forced to sell this property, which was subsequently divided up for development.  The farm manager's house was built in a similar style. This two storied neo-classical masonry house stands in nearby Warren Avenue, separated from the main house by the many houses of the area. The area maintains part of its original farmland image as large tracts of land were purchased by various institutions; several Roman Catholic schools, The Church of Jesus Christ of Latter-day Saints, and the Masonic Retirement Village.

After Williamson's death in 1888, the lavish establishment was taken over by the Bank of New Zealand and leased to the Anglican church, and was purchased by the Sisters of Mercy in 1913. More recently, Monte Cecilia House was used as a temporary residence for the homeless and new immigrants, but this operation has been relocated to new premises in Māngere.

On 1 September 1983, the building was registered by the New Zealand Historic Places Trust as a Category I heritage structure, with reference number 89.

In September 2002 Pah Homestead was purchased by the Auckland City Council as part of council plans to develop the surrounding estate into a premier park for the city, Monte Cecilia Park. The council developed a heritage conservation plan, an archaeological and geophysical assessment and a cultural heritage overview for Whataroa Pā. A landscape history and tree assessment were produced to help better understand the Māori and European heritage of the site.

Monte Cecilia Catholic School, a neighbour of The Pah since 1913, will be moved to a new building on the grounds of the nearby St John Vianney Catholic Church, Hillsborough.

Restoration

The council upgraded the Pah Homestead roof as part of its commitment to protecting and preserving heritage buildings in Auckland city. The restoration involved weatherproofing, reinforcing the structure of the roof and some seismic upgrading. The council selected materials matching the original roof like English slate tiles and rolled lead.

Auckland City worked with other groups and organisations like New Zealand Historic Places Trust and specialist heritage architects Matthews & Matthews Architects Ltd. to ensure the renovation is of a high standard. These works were undertaken by NZ Strong Construction, an Auckland construction company specializing in unique projects such as this.

Refurbishment of exterior joinery and façade is now completed, with drainage works and fire protection undertaken to prevent further deterioration of the building.

Called the TSB Bank Wallace Arts Centre, it opened to the public in August 2010. The building now houses the James Wallace Art Trust's collection of New Zealand art, which is valued at NZ$50 million. The collection and regular exhibitions, such as that of image-maker Vincent Ward  titled Exhale in 2012, are on display free of charge.

Television and film
Over the years the house and its grounds have been used as the shooting locations in a number of television and film productions.

The Quiet Earth (1985)
Gloss (1987) [NZ TV-Series 1987-1990]
Lucy (2003) (TV)
Ike: Countdown to D-Day (2004) (TV)
The Chronicles of Narnia: The Lion, the Witch and the Wardrobe (2005)

References

External links
 The TSB Bank Wallace Arts Centre, Pah Homestead
 Wallace Arts Trust
 Photographs of Pah Homestead held in Auckland Libraries' heritage collections.

Buildings and structures in Auckland
Houses in New Zealand
Tourist attractions in Auckland
Heritage New Zealand Category 1 historic places in the Auckland Region
Art museums and galleries in Auckland
Arts centres in New Zealand
1880s architecture in New Zealand